New Inn is a hamlet in County Laois, Ireland. It is near Emo on the R445 regional road just off the M7 motorway. New Inn lies within the townland of Cappakeel, also called Ballymulrony (Baile Uí Mhaoilruanaidh).

See also
List of towns and villages in Ireland
Emo Court

Towns and villages in County Laois